Tear It Down is the first remix album from the American rock group My Brightest Diamond.

Content
The thirteen-track album was released on compact disc and digital download with Asthmatic Kitty, on 6 March 2007. Tear It Down features remixed versions of songs from My Brightest Diamond's previous album, Bring Me the Workhorse. The remixes were made by obscure collaborators of Worden, and by MySpace friends. In an interview with Brightest Young Things, Worden says "I had produced Bring Me the Workhorse myself, and felt interested in hearing how some electronically minded folks would deal with the songs, how that would affect the feelings in the lyrics, and how taking the songs out of a rock context would alter the impression of the material." The title, Tear It Down comes from a line in the song "Freak Out."

Reception

A review from AllMusic says the Tear It Down "turns over Bring Me the Workhorses tracks to sonic manipulators, most of whom go with a subtle, stripped-down approach that focuses on Worden's glorious voice and string arrangements, augmented by a few abstract beats," and closes with noting "like most remix albums, Tear It Down is a little uneven, but it's more solidly entertaining than many similar projects -- and at the very least, it offers My Brightest Diamond fans a fresh way to enjoy Worden's work." A mixed review by PopMatters notes that the album "doesn't totally fail as a cohesive unit is a testament, primarily, to Shara Worden's distinctive voice; but it's also a measure of the invasiveness (or lack thereof) of the remixes themselves."

Track listing

References
Citations

Bibliography

External links

2007 remix albums
Asthmatic Kitty remix albums
My Brightest Diamond albums